Koplowitz is a surname, and may refer to:

 Alicia Koplowitz (b. 1954), Spanish businesswoman
 Dan Koplowitz (b. 1980), founder of US recording label Friendly Fire Recordings
 Esther Koplowitz (b. 1953), Spanish businesswoman
 Oskar Koplowitz (1911–1984), German-born US author, known as Oskar Seidlin
 Zoe Koplowitz (b. 1948), US marathon runner

Slavic-language surnames
Jewish surnames